Ham is a hamlet near the town of Sandwich in Kent, England, within the parish of Northbourne. The population is included in the civil parish of Eastry.

There is a signpost nearby which points to both the hamlet and the town, thus appearing to read "Ham Sandwich".

References

Dover District
Hamlets in Kent